Pash Bolagh (also Romanized as Pāsh Bolāgh; also known as Pāzh Bolāgh) is a village in Il Teymur Rural District, in the Central District of Bukan County, West Azerbaijan Province, Iran. At the 2006 census, its population was 239, in 42 families.

References

Populated places in Bukan County